Tobais Palmer (born February 20, 1990) is an American football wide receiver who is a free agent. He played college football at North Carolina State. He was a member of the Jacksonville Jaguars, San Diego Chargers, New Orleans Saints, Buffalo Bills, Pittsburgh Steelers, Carolina Panthers, Montreal Allouettes, Toronto Argonauts, and The Birmingham Iron.

Early years
Palmer was born in Pittsboro, North Carolina. He was a two-time offensive player of the year in his conference. He earned the Chatham County male athlete of the year award while attending Northwood High School.

College career
In his final seasons at NC State, He finished with a total of 91 receptions, 1,277 receiving yards and 11 receiving touchdowns. He is also the new leading All-Purpose leader in the ACC. He also played at the Georgia Military College.

Professional career

Jacksonville Jaguars
On April 27, 2013, he signed with the Jacksonville Jaguars as an undrafted free agent. He was released on August 30 and signed to the team's practice squad on September 1. On September 28, he was promoted to the active roster. He was released on September 30 and signed to the practice squad the next day. He was released from the practice squad on October 8.

San Diego Chargers
On November 19, 2013, Palmer signed with the San Diego Chargers to their practice squad. On May 21, 2014, he was waived-injured by the Chargers.

New Orleans Saints
On August 6, 2014, Palmer signed with the New Orleans Saints.

On August 25, 2014, Palmer was released from the New Orleans Saints.

Buffalo Bills
Palmer signed a 2-year contract / $960,000 with the Buffalo Bills, including an annual average salary of $480,000. On September 4, 2015, he was released by the Bills.

Pittsburgh Steelers
On February 4, 2016, Palmer signed a futures contract with the Pittsburgh Steelers. On May 11, 2016, palmer was released by the Steelers.

Carolina Panthers
On May 20, 2016, Palmer signed with the Carolina Panthers. On August 9, 2016, the Panthers waived/injured Palmer. He reverted to injured reserve on August 10, 2016. He was waived with an injury settlement on August 16, 2016.

Montreal Alouettes
On January 19, 2017, Palmer signed with the Montreal Alouettes of the Canadian Football League (CFL). He was released by the Alouettes on May 28, 2017.

Toronto Argonauts
On February 21, 2018, Palmer signed with the Toronto Argonauts of the Canadian Football League as a free agent. He was released by the Argonauts on May 26, 2018.

Birmingham Iron
Palmer signed with the Birmingham Iron of the Alliance of American Football for the 2019 season. He was placed on injured reserve on April 1, 2019. The league ceased operations in April 2019.

References

External links 
 Toronto Argonauts bio
 Jacksonville Jaguars bio
 New Orleans Saints bio
 North Carolina State bio
 San Diego Chargers bio

Living people
People from Pittsboro, North Carolina
Players of American football from North Carolina
American football wide receivers
Canadian football wide receivers
American players of Canadian football
NC State Wolfpack football players
Jacksonville Jaguars players
San Diego Chargers players
New Orleans Saints players
Buffalo Bills players
Pittsburgh Steelers players
1990 births
Toronto Argonauts players
Montreal Alouettes players
Carolina Panthers players
Birmingham Iron players